State Route 14 (SR 14) is a south–north route from the Mississippi border in Memphis, Tennessee to an intersection with State Route 54 in Tipton County.

Route description

Shelby County
SR 14 begins concurrent to US 61 at the Mississippi state line in Shelby County. US 61 and SR 14 travel northward passed several subdivisions before entering Memphis (as S Third Street) and having an intersection with SR 175.  It then goes through some more neighborhoods before passing through a business district, crossing a railroad overpass and having an interchange with I-55 (Exit 7). US 61/SR 14 then pass through some more neighborhoods before coming to an intersection with E.H. Crump Boulevard (US 64/US 70/US 79/SR 1), at which point US 61 turns west along E.H. Crump Boulevard to become concurrent with I-55 and cross the Mississippi River into Arkansas while SR 14 continues north on S Third Street to become concurrent with US 64/US 70/US 79/SR 1 and enter downtown. Up until this point, SR 14 is unsigned. The concurrency passes through downtown as a one-way pair of Second and Third Streets, where they have an intersection with US 78/SR 278 (Doctor M.L.K. Jr Avenue), before US 64/US 70/US 79/SR 1 turns east along Union Avenue. SR 14 then becomes concurrent with SR 3 and they continue through downtown before having an interchange with I-40 (Exit 1A). They then leave downtown and come to an intersection with A.W. Willis Avenue, where SR 14 turns east to follow that Street to an intersection with Danny Thomas Blvd (US 51/SR 4) and North Parkway (SR 1), while SR 3 continues north along Second and Third Streets. SR 14 then turns north along that route for a short distance before turning east onto Jackson Avenue as a lone route.  On Jackson Avenue, SR 14 passes through the "North Memphis" neighborhood and has another interchange with I-40/I-69 (Exit 1F). It then continues through the neighborhood and passes by an industrial area before having its third and final interchange with I-40 (Exit 8 eastbound, Exit 8 A/B westbound) and transitioning from Jackson Avenue to Austin Peay Highway as it enters the neighborhood of "Raleigh". SR 14 then widens to an 8-lane freeway and has interchanges with Old Austin Peay Highway, SR 15 (James Road), and another with Old Austin Peay Highway before narrowing back down to 4-lanes and enters a business district. The highway then continues to an intersection with SR 204 (Covington Pike/Singleton Parkway) before leaving Memphis altogether and narrowing to a 2-lane highway with a 55 MPH speed limit. It then has an interchange with I-269 (Paul Barret Parkway; formerly part of and still signed as SR 385; no exit number signed) just north of the crossing of the Loosahatchie River. SR 14 then continues northeast to enter farmland and have an intersection with SR 205 in Rosemark before crossing into Tipton County.

SR 14's entire route within the city of Memphis, except through downtown, is at least 4-lanes wide.

Tipton County

The highway continues northeast through farmland as it widens to a 4-lane divided highway for short distance to have an intersection with SR 206 and then SR 384 before narrowing to 2-lanes again and passing through more farmland to have an intersection with SR 59. SR 14 then continues northeast to an intersection with SR 179 before continuing northeast to come to an end at an intersection with SR 54 in the tiny community of Cotton Lake, just before State Route 54 crosses the Hatchie River.

Future

The Tipton County portion from the Shelby County line to just the northeast of State Route 384 is a four-lane divided highway. Long-term plans include expanding the Shelby County portion to at least four lanes as well. Construction is currently underway on this expansion between Old Brownsville Road and Kerrville-Rosemark Road.

Major intersections
The mileposts listed in the following table is only an estimated calculation. Actual mile markers may vary.

See also

References

014
Transportation in Memphis, Tennessee
Transportation in Shelby County, Tennessee
Transportation in Tipton County, Tennessee
Freeways in Tennessee